Anorthosis Kato Polemidia is a Cypriot association football club based in Kato Polemidia, located in the Limassol District. It has 6 participations in Cypriot Fourth Division.

References

Football clubs in Cyprus
Association football clubs established in 1940
1940 establishments in Cyprus